Paul Sciarra (born c. 1981) is an American Internet entrepreneur. He is a co-founder of Pinterest.

Early life
Sciarra was born circa 1981. He graduated from Yale University.

Career 
Sciarra worked at venture capital firm Radius Ventures, LLC. In 2003 he quit his job, along with Ben Silbermann, to create Cold Brew Labs. That same year, Sciarra, Silbermann and Evan Sharp launched Pinterest, and Sciarra became the President and CEO. In 2012, he left the company but remained on as an advisor.

After leaving Pinterest, Sciarra took a role as an entrepreneur-in-residence at venture capital firm Andreessen Horowitz.
In 2014, he became executive chairman of Joby Aviation, after making its first outside investment.

Personal life
Sciarra resides in San Francisco, California. According to Forbes, he was worth an estimated $550 million in 2016.

References

External links 

Living people
1980s births
Businesspeople from San Francisco
Yale University alumni
American technology company founders
Pinterest people
Giving Pledgers
21st-century philanthropists